Nichelino is a comune (municipality) in the Metropolitan City of Turin in the Italian region Piedmont, located about  southwest of Turin. 

Nichelino borders the following municipalities: Turin, Orbassano, Beinasco, Moncalieri, Candiolo, and Vinovo.

History

In 1559 Nichelino was a fief of the Ussel (Occelli) family, becoming a county in 1564. In the late 17th century it has some 400 inhabitants, mostly working as peasants. In 1854, when it had some 1,700 inhabitants, the first train station was built in the town. The population remained nearly stable until the mid-20th century, when a huge immigration flow from southern Italy had it increase from the c. 15,000 of 1961 to the some 45,000 of 1971.

Main sights

The frazione of Stupinigi houses the famous Palazzina di Stupinigi, part of the UNESCO list of World Heritage Sites. The castle, also known as Palazzo Occelli (1565), is also notable.

Twin towns
 Caluire-et-Cuire, France
 Victoria, Malta, Malta

References

External links
 Official website
 www.nichelino.com/

Cities and towns in Piedmont
Castles in Italy